Cambodian irredentism is a nationalist movement in Cambodia that refers to the land that used to be part of the Khmer Empire. The movement is aimed against Thai, Vietnamese, and Laotian control over the territories. Both official and unofficial Cambodian claims on territories viewed as having been under some form of Cambodian sovereignty are rhetorically tied back to an accused expansionism.

History 
Up until the establishment of the Thai and Laotian states, the Khmer Empire was the major land power and a dominant force in mainland Southeast Asia. The territory of Cambodia encompassed most of what would be now Thailand, Laos, part of Myanmar and Southern Vietnam; in an extent, it encroached to even mainland Malaysia. However, subsequent problems and turmoils, as well as the rapid advance by the Vietnamese, Laotians and Thais brought Cambodia's empire into a declining state. Among all, the Thais and the Vietnamese were seen to have done the most harm to Cambodia, causing significant physical traumas for the people of the nation. In order to survive, Cambodia came under a French protectorate, only to find itself being grouped within Vietnamese-dominated French Indochina, and with the French favoring Vietnamese instead of Cambodians. At the outbreak of the First Indochina War Khmer irredentism began to rise. Nonetheless, it was not officially espoused until 1970 when Lon Nol overthrew the monarchy and replaced it with a Republic, where it became increasingly nationalistic and chauvinist, leading to the persecution and massacres of ethnic Vietnamese and Chams. The Khmer Rouge later inherited these nationalistic sentiments which were part of the driving force for the persecution and massacres of Vietnamese in Cambodia as a part of the Cambodian Genocide, and which was one the motivations for Khmer Rouge incursions in Vietnam and occupations of Vietnamese territories which resulted in several massacres of Vietnamese civilians, the most notorious of which was the Ba Chúc massacre.

Modern irredentism

Mekong Delta
The Cambodians hold a significant amount of hostility to Vietnam with regard to their loss of the Mekong Delta to the Vietnamese in history, and the subsequent enforced Vietnamization and conflicts which Vietnam repeatedly occupied the country, French favoritism to the Vietnamese, and the lack of cultural commonalities with Vietnam being part of the Sinosphere while Cambodia belongs to the Indosphere. This often drew Cambodian nationalist sentiments with the desire to reclaim territory from Vietnam. Both Lon Nol and Pol Pot utilized this grievance in order to spread Cambodian irredentism.

Currently, Cambodian irredentists still feel strongly attached to the region, and as a result, they believe  it is a lost territory which should be returned to Cambodia. The expression of this sentiment has frequently ignited various protests, notably the 2013–2014 Cambodian protests, and Vietnam is frequently blamed for all of the turmoil and problems which occur within Cambodia, partly because Hun Sen is closely affiliated with Vietnam. This sentiment has sometimes driven Cambodia to forge close ties with China, a country which Vietnam has a strong feeling of enmity towards due to the fact that it was ruled by China for over one thousand years.

In addition to the Mekong Delta, Cambodian nationalists seek to reclaim Phú Quốc, which Cambodians frequently call "Koh Trol", based on their belief that it was part of Cambodian territory before it was annexed by Vietnam, and it often attracts a number of Cambodian celebrities.

Thailand
While tensions with Thailand are now receiving lesser attention, many Cambodians nonetheless have a long-standing hostility in regard to Thailand, due to the fact that most of Thailand used to be under Khmer control until the rise of the Sukhothai Kingdom, and subsequent conflicts which started the demise of Cambodia as a regional power and repeated Thai occupations of Cambodia. Therefore, a strong anti-Thai sentiment developed in Cambodia as a result, with many Cambodians believing that many Thai cultural acquisitions today are the work of Khmers, and that Thailand has been trying to steal Cambodian culture and customs.

Cambodia and Thailand also engaged in border disputes from 2008 to 2011 with regard to Preah Vihear Temple. Eventually, Cambodia acquired the temple following the dispute. There is also irredentism against Thailand with regard to Northern Khmer people, where Cambodians still see them part of Cambodian nation, and that lower part of northeastern Thailand should have been Cambodian.

Laos
Cambodian irredentists have objected to the existence of Laos as an independent state, believing that southern Laos should have been Cambodian territory. This has led to some sporadic tensions from 2017 to 2019. In 2019, Cambodia and Laos removed troops from the disputes area surrounding Stung Treng.

See also
Khmer nationalism

References

Cambodia
Cambodian irredentism
Politics of Cambodia
Cambodian nationalism